is a bay located within Aomori Prefecture, in the northern Tōhoku region of northern Japan.

Names
Mutsu Bay is the dominant English term used in English for the body of water; however it has historically been referred to as the Gulf of Mutsu.

Geography

Mutsu Bay includes Aomori Bay in the southwest, Noheji Bay in the southeast and Ōminato Bay to the northeast.

Resources
Economically, the shallow waters of the bay are an important fishery, with the cultivation of scallops predominating. Other products commercially harvested include Sea cucumber, Olive flounder and Ascidiacea. The fisheries were severely damaged by the 2010 Northern Hemisphere summer heat waves.

In the year 2002, the Ministry of the Environment classified some tidal flats of the eastern Mutsu Bay shoreline to be one of the 500 Important Wetlands in Japan.

Pacific white-sided dolphins are regular migrants into the bay annually, and whale watching and surveys using ferries have been conducted.

Gallery

References

Notes

Bays of Japan
Tourist attractions in Aomori Prefecture
Landforms of Aomori Prefecture
Mutsu, Aomori
Aomori (city)
Yokohama, Aomori
Noheji, Aomori
Hiranai, Aomori
Sotogahama, Aomori